Luis Poggi (7 December 1928 – 4 November 2017) was a Peruvian cyclist. He competed in the individual and team road race events at the 1948 Summer Olympics.

References

External links
 

1928 deaths
2017 deaths
Peruvian male cyclists
Olympic cyclists of Peru
Cyclists at the 1948 Summer Olympics
Place of birth missing
20th-century Peruvian people